The Eagle's Nest (theatrically as Medan vi lever) is a 2020 Cameroonian action thriller film directed by British-Cameroonian filmmaker Olivier Assoua and co-produced by director himself with Magno Assoua Adeline and Sybile Aline Njoke. The film stars Claude S Mbida Nkou and Felicity Asseh in lead roles, whereas Axel Abessolo, Richard Essame made supportive roles. The film revolves around two sex workers who start to change their destiny by moving to another country. The music was co-composed by Arthur & The Invicibles and Andy Payne.

The film was screened at many international film festivals such as: Austin Film Festival 2020, Raindance Film Festival 2020 Montreal International Black Film Festival 2020 and Hollywood International Diversity Film Festival 2021. The film received positive acclaim from critics and won several awards.

Cast 
 Claude S Mbida Nkou as Paris Ewane
 Felicity Asseh as Samantha Penne 
 Axel Abessolo as Otam
 Richard Essame as Jean-Pierre Obama

Awards and accolades
 Jury Award: Best African Film - Toronto International Nollywood International Film Festival 2021 - won
 Best Director at the Hollywood International Diversity Film Festival 2021 - won
 Best Actress at the Hollywood International Diversity Film Festival 2021 - won
 Best First Time Director at the Silk Road Film Awards Cannes. October, 2020 - won
 Finalist: Wales International Film Festival 2020
 Semi-finalist: Cannes International Independent Film Festival - CIIFF 2020
 Dark Maters category at Austin Film Festival 2020 - nominated
 Best cinematography at Raindance Film Festival 2020 - nominated
 Best film by an African living abroad at the African Movie Academy Awards (AMAA) 2020 - nominated
 Best Lead Actress in a Foreign Language Film at the 9th Nice International Film Festival 2021 - won

References

External links 
 

2020 films
2020 crime thriller films
Cameroonian drama films
Burkinabé drama films
2020s French-language films